Panther Valley High School is a small public high school providing grades 7 to 12, in Lansford in Carbon County, Pennsylvania. It is the only high school for the Panther Valley School District and serves students from both Carbon County and Schuylkill County, Pennsylvania. 

According to the National Center for Education Statistics, the school reported an enrollment of 730 pupils in grades 7 through 12 in the 2020-21 school year.

Extracurriculars
The district offers a wide variety of clubs, activities and after-school sports.

Athletics 
Panther Valley competes in the Pennsylvania Interscholastic Athletic Association's District XI.

Panther Valley has high school teams in the following sports:
Football
Baseball
Basketball
Cheerleading
Softball
Track and Field
Volleyball
Wrestling

References

External links 
 Official website

1973 establishments in Pennsylvania
Educational institutions established in 1973
Public high schools in Pennsylvania
Schools in Carbon County, Pennsylvania